The Venerable (John) Hewitt Wilson CB, MA (14 February 1924 – 29 June 2008) was an eminent Anglican priest in the second half of the 20th century.

He was born on 14 February 1924 and educated at Kilkenny College and Trinity College, Dublin. After a curacy at St. George's Church, Dublin he entered the RAF Chaplaincy Service, serving in a variety of locations before eventually becoming its Archdeacon (Chaplain-in-Chief). serving for seven years.

He was Archdeacon Emeritus from 1980 and Rector of The Heyfords with Rousham and Somerton until 1993. He died on 29 June 2008.

Notes and references

1924 births
2008 deaths
People educated at Kilkenny College
Alumni of Trinity College Dublin
Companions of the Order of the Bath
Royal Air Force Chaplains-in-Chief